HK Kryvbas is an ice hockey club from Kryvyi Rih, Ukraine, that joined the Ukrainian Hockey League prior to the 2016–17 season.

References

External links
 
 HK Kryvbas  Еurohockey

Ice hockey teams in Ukraine
Ice hockey clubs established in 2016
2016 establishments in Ukraine
Sport in Kryvyi Rih